Mehlika Öztürk (born 29 June 1997) is a Turkish freestyle wrestler. She won a bronze medal at the 2020 Individual Wrestling World Cup held in Belgrade, Serbia and she won the silver medal in beach wrestling in her event at the 2019 World Beach Games held in Doha, Qatar.

Early life 

Mehlika Öztürk was born in Manisa, Turkey. She is a member of Enka SK.

Career 

She competed in the women's freestyle 57 kg event at the 2018 European Wrestling Championships held in Kaspiysk, Russia. She was eliminated in her first match by Alyona Kolesnik of Azerbaijan.

In 2019, she represented Turkey at the World Beach Games in Doha, Qatar and she won the silver medal in the women's 60 kg beach wrestling event.

In 2020, at the European Wrestling Championships held in Rome, Italy, she competed in the women's 57 kg event where she was eliminated in her second match. In the same year, she won one of the bronze medals in the women's 57 kg event at the 2020 Individual Wrestling World Cup held in Belgrade, Serbia.
 In April 2021, she was eliminated in her first match in the women's 57 kg event at the European Wrestling Championships in Warsaw, Poland. In October 2021, she was also eliminated in her first match in the women's 55 kg event at the World Wrestling Championships held in Oslo, Norway.

In 2022, she competed at the Yasar Dogu Tournament held in Istanbul, Turkey.

Major results

References

External links 

 

1997 births
Living people
Sportspeople from Manisa
Turkish female sport wrestlers
Enkaspor athletes
21st-century Turkish sportswomen